Zenith Records is a vinyl record pressing plant based in Melbourne, Australia, established in 2005.

Overview
Zenith was founded by Australian artist Pegz, owner of Obese Records, who purchased and fixed the pressing machinery so that it was on par with international pressing plants.

The machinery at Zenith had originated at Nick Phillips' Corduroy Records pressing plant which was sold to Zenith Records in 2005. Their pressing plants had been in Australia for decades as part of record labels like Modern and Sundown, but have since been refurbished. Originally located in Richmond, the plant relocated to East Brunswick in 2013. The label is now run by co-owner Paul Rigby.

Zenith has four Alpha-Toolex record presses in operation, a Neumann record cutting lathe, as well as its own record matrix-making facilities. Plating of the record masters is done in-house, as well as the production of mothers, stampers, or converts.

See also
 List of independent record labels

References

External links
 Zenith Records
  Sydney Morning Herald Article July 2012
 2021 article on Australian record pressers, including an interview with Zenith Records' Paul Rigby

Australian independent record labels
Record labels established in 2005
Record labels based in Melbourne